

This is a list of programs formerly broadcast by Radio Caracas Televisión (this list includes Radio Caracas Televisión's original productions only).

Currently broadcast by RCTV

News
Alerta (1975-1999; 2006-2010)
Los Chismes De La Bicha (2007-2010)
La Entrevista (2001-2010)
El Observador (1953-2012)

Telenovelas
Por todo lo alto
Camaleona
Mujer con pantalones
La Invasora
Hoy te vi
Niña mimada

Reality
Ají Picante (2000-2010)
 Casting RCTV (2004)
 Date con Todo (2006)
 Fama y Aplausos / Fama Sudor y Lágrimas (2001-2007)
 Justicia Para Todos (1999-2000)
 Montados en la olla (2008-2010)
 La Pareja Dispareja (2008)

Talk show/variety
A Puerta Cerrada (1983-1997; 2007-2010)
Un Angel En El Observador (1999-2007)
Cita Con Las Estrellas (2003)
De Boca En Boca (1999)
Loco Video Loco (1992-2010)
Momentos RCTV (2007)
Poniendo La Comica (2007)
Radio Rochela (1961-2010)
Sábado Espectacular (1968-1971, 1989-1990, 1999)
Sábado Mundial (1992-1995)
El Show de Renny (1958-1959; 1961-1962; 1964-1965; 1967-1971)

Game show
Al Pie de la Letra (2006-2007)
Aló RCTV (1999-2000)
Aprieta y Gana (2000-2006)
Arranca (2005-2006)
Avízzzpate (1999-2000)
Concurso Millonario (1986-1988)
El Precio Justo (2004)
¿Quién Quiere Ser Millonario? (2000-present)

Documentary
Bitácora (1994-present)

Formerly broadcast by RCTV

See also
RCTV

RCTV